Frederica Louise Ernst (1714 – 1781) was a Danish merchant, ship owner and slave trader. She was the daughter of an architect and government official. Being an unmarried woman, she was legally under the guardianship of her closest male relative for life. In 1758, however, she successfully applied for legal majority. She was a successful businesswoman and invested in a number of business: she owned shares of a warehouse, ships and a sugar plantation on Danish St. Croix. She was also involved in the Danish slave trade.  In 1765, she founded a factory for the cleaning and combing flax and hemp. This was an innovation in Denmark, involving machinery advanced for its time. Initially successful, in 1772, she tried to recoup her loans, but her money was tied up in the West Indies. This was a setback, and by the time of her death in 1781, she had lost most of her money. Ernst was rare as a female industrialist in Denmark, at the time, but she was particularly rare because she was unmarried: almost all businesswomen in Denmark of the time, especially within bigger business, were widows or married women who had their husband's permission to involve in business, while unmarried women were very rare.

See also

 Charlotta Richardy
 Maria Augustin

References

1781 deaths
1714 births
18th-century Danish businesswomen
18th-century Danish businesspeople
18th-century Danish women landowners
Danish businesspeople in shipping
Danish planters
Danish slave owners
Danish slave traders
Danish sugar plantation owners
Ship owners